North Pier Apartments is a 581 ft (177m) tall skyscraper in Chicago, Illinois. It was completed in 1990 and has 61 floors. Dubin Dubin Black and Moutoussamy designed the building, which is the 43rd tallest and the tallest precast concrete panel clad building when completed, in Chicago. The buildings façade has dark gray, maroon, and pink panels in an abstract pattern. It was named after North Pier, a long building to the west along Ogden Slip. It has been described by the architects to be masculine counterpart to the curvaceous Lake Point Tower nearby.

The North Pier Apartment Tower was officially renamed "474 North Lake Shore Drive" when the building was converted to condominiums in 2005.

See also
List of tallest buildings in Chicago

Position in Chicago's skyline
Scroll to the right to see it

References
Emporis
Skyscraperpage
474 North Lake Shore Drive Condominiums

Residential buildings completed in 1990
Residential condominiums in Chicago
Residential skyscrapers in Chicago
Streeterville, Chicago
1990 establishments in Illinois